E-card is an electronic postcard or greeting card, with the primary difference being that it is created using digital media instead of paper or other traditional materials. E-cards are made available many different ways, usually on various Internet sites. They can be sent to a recipient virtually, usually via e-mail or an instant messaging service. 

Since e-cards are digital "content", they are highly editable, allowing them to be extensively personalised by the sender. They are also capable of presenting animated gifs or video.

Typically, an E-card sender chooses from an on-line catalog of E-cards made available on a publisher's web site. After selecting a card, the sender can personalize it to various degrees by adding a message, photo, or video. Finally, the sender specifies the recipient's e-mail address and the web site delivers an e-mail message to the recipient on behalf of the sender.

Technological evolution
Since its conception in 1994 by Judith Donath, the technology behind the E-Card has changed significantly. One technical aspect that has remained mostly constant is the delivery mechanism: the e-mail received by the recipient contains not the E-card itself, but an individually coded link back to the publisher's web site that displays the sender's card.

Postcards and greeting cards
Like their paper counterparts, "postcards" use visual art (static or animated images or video) and provide a space for a personal note to be added.  These were the first type of E-card in use. Like their paper counterparts, cyber "greeting cards" provide a greeting along with the visual art. Variations range from E-cards with fixed greetings like a paper card to selectable greetings (from drop-down lists or other selection options) to changeable suggested greetings.

Flash animation
This type of E-card is based on two-dimensional vector animation controlled with a scripting language. The format is proprietary to Adobe; however, widespread usage of Adobe's software prior to its discontinuation allowed this type of card to be easily viewed on most computers.  The recipient would usually see an animated short usually 15–30 seconds in duration.  These animations often had a cartoonish style due to the nature of the content, though some Flash creations can be quite sophisticated and realistic.  A sound track which may contain speech or music could accompany the animation.

Flash animated greeting cards also could include interactivity, for example, asking the viewer to choose a picture to animate, but most Flash E-cards were designed to convey the sentiment of the sender through simple observation.

Flash animated cards were offered by almost all major E-card publishers and were consequently the most common format used. When Flash stopped being supported by Adobe December 31, 2020, companies producing E-cards had to adopt more modern ways to display files.

Video E-cards
"Video E-cards" use a combination of personalized text, photo, and video to convey the message to the recipient. A number of such services exist such as Rattlebox where the user selects and customizes text on a prerecorded video, DVCards.com where a user with a web camera actually records their own video to send or through platforms such as Guestory.

Mobile E-cards
With the advance in mobile technologies, Multimedia Messaging Service (MMS), essentially picture SMS, became more and more popular. E-cards can now be sent to mobile devices and phones. Mobile E-cards or 'MCards' as they are more commonly known are then offered by different mobile content providers and carriers. Similar to E-cards, MCards can contain multiple pictures, music and text messages. Also MCards are considered the cards sent via one or another mobile application.

One of the first companies that created MCards is a Dutch Company called Mgreetings (established in 2003). MCards can be sent from a PC in a similar way as sending E-cards. Users can go to a website online, select a card enter the recipient's mobile number, and that card will be sent to the recipient's mobile phone as an MMS.

History
The greeting card metaphor was employed early in the life of the World Wide Web. The first postcard site, The Electric Postcard was created in late 1994 by Judith Donath at the MIT Media Lab. It started slowly: 10-20 cards a day were sent in the first weeks, 1000-2000 a day over the first summer, and then it gained momentum rapidly. During the 1995-96 Christmas season, there were days when over 19,000 cards were sent; by late spring of 1996 over 1.7 million cards had been sent in total. The source code for this service was made publicly available, with the stipulation that users share improvements with each other. The Electric Postcard won numerous awards, including a 1995 GNN Best of the Net award.

MIT's postcards and remained the dominant and the only documented E-card service until the late fall of 1995. In Nov 1995, Awesome Cyber Cards and also then known as marlo.com (located at marlo.com until Oct 2010, now moved), began developing the Internet greeting card, a digital Internet card including a fixed or suggested greeting as well as an image.

When the Internet Archive began capturing Web sites across the Internet in the fall of 1996, it created a reservoir of information about E-card development by preserving Internet history from that time and from earlier time-marked Internet pages captured at that time. The Awesome Cards web pages, captured on Nov 10,1996 and available at the Wayback Machine  demonstrate its development of the cyber greeting card through the year 1996 as one drills down through its card collections. Specifically, the holiday collections from earlier that same year give a virtual time-stamp,.  of greeting card development, starting with Valentines with fixed or semi-fixed greetings in February 1996 and progressing through greeting cards with changeable suggested greetings by the Thanksgiving collection.

By mid-1996, a number of sites had developed E-cards. By mid October 1996, directly emailable greeting cards and postcards ("Email Express") were developed and introduced by Awesome Cards, based on new capabilities introduced in the Netscape 3.0 browser. This is the first time the E-card itself could be emailed directly by the card sender to the recipient rather than having an announcement sent with a link to the card's location at the E-card site.

Between Sep 1996 and Thanksgiving 1997, a paper greeting card company named Blue Mountain developed E-cards on its web site. Blue Mountain grew quickly by allowing visitors to create greetings for others to use. Blue Mountain further expanded when Microsoft promoted its service on its free Hotmail service. This affiliation ceased and Blue Mountain sued Microsoft in Nov 1998 for putting email card announcements from it and other E-card companies in the junk folder of its Hotmail users.

By 1999, major capital was starting to flow into the Internet, beginning the dotcom boom. The transaction has been referenced by CNN and Business 2.0 as evidence of the Dot-com bubble. The web site BlueMountain.com remains a large web site, primarily focused on E-cards. In June 2008, JustAnotherDotCom.com purchased the free E-card site Greeting-cards.com and added it to their own greeting card site, which made them one of the largest E-card sites in the world.

Several non-profit organizations offer free E-cards as a way of having a supporter introduce the organization to another individual.  In 2006, SOS Children's Villages - USA began offering free E-cards for many occasions such as birthdays, thank yous, and Mother's Day.

According to data provided by Google, searches for e-cards have declined to less than 1% of their past levels, with interest declining since record-keeping began in 2004.

Security 
Sending an E-card to a given recipient invariably involves giving that recipient's email address to the E-card service – a third party. As with other third-party email services (such as mailing-list companies), the operator has the chance to misuse this address. One example of misuse is if the E-card service sends advertisements to the recipient's address. Under anti-spam rules used by major ISPs, such advertisements would be spam, since the recipient never asked ("opted in") to receive them.

Data privacy laws may prohibit a business from disclosing names, email addresses, or other personal information about customers to a third party.

In late June 2007 a spate of emails with the subject line "You've received a postcard from a family member!" and other similar subjects, was seen making their way across the internet. Most of these emails contained links to malicious web sites where JavaScript was used to exploit the browser in order to compromise a system, or contained a link to a malware file masquerading as an E-card.

See also
 Cardmaking
 E-mail
 Greeting cards

References

External links 

Stationery
Ephemera
Email